The Libertarian Enterprise is an online publication begun in October 1995. It is published by L. Neil Smith.  Currently it comes out every Sunday with a new issue.  It has been edited by Ken Holder for the past few years.

Articles, essays, and letters are almost exclusively prose and non-fiction, though some poetry and some fiction have appeared in the zine.  

Authors whose essays appear in The Libertarian Enterprise include L. Neil Smith, Aaron Zelman, Claire Wolfe, Jason Sorens, Victor Milán, Anders Monsen, and Vin Suprynowicz.

One of the historically significant articles which have appeared in The Libertarian Enterprise is the announcement in July 2001 of the Free State Project. Written by Jason Sorens, this essay was the initial launch point for the Free State Project and related efforts such as Free State Wyoming.

As of 5 November 2017, The Libertarian Enterprise was on its 947th issue.  Published monthly in 1995 and through July 1996, it began to come out semi-monthly in August 1996.  The Fort Collins Flood in 1997 delayed the publication for a few months.  The editor of the publication resigned in 1997, which may account for the sparse publication schedule in 1998.  Semi-monthly publication began again in earnest in the second half of 1999.  Semi-monthly issues continued through 2000.  Weekly or more frequent issues began coming out in 2001.

The magazine began a new format with issue 176 in June 2002.  With some changes, that format persists to the present.

References

External links
 The Libertarian Enterprise current issue

Bimonthly magazines published in the United States
Monthly magazines published in the United States
Online magazines published in the United States
Weekly magazines published in the United States
Magazines established in 1995
Biweekly magazines published in the United States
Sunday magazines